The Great Retreat, also known in Serbian historiography as the Albanian Golgotha ( / Albanska golgota), was a strategic withdrawal of the Royal Serbian Army, which marked the end of the second Serbian campaign of World War I.

In late October 1915, Germany, Austria-Hungary and Bulgaria launched a synchronised major offensive against Serbia. That same month, France and Britain landed four divisions at Salonika, but were unable to move north to help their outnumbered Serbian ally caught between the invading forces. The Serbs slowly retreated southwards with the plan to withdraw into Macedonia to link up with Allied forces. After Bulgarian forces prevented a French advance in the Vardar Valley and the defection of Greece, the Serbs found themselves swept together in the plain of Kosovo by the converging Austro-Hungarian, German, and Bulgarian columns; few options remained to escape the invaders encirclement.

On 23 November 1915, the government and the supreme command made the decision to retreat across the mountains of Montenegro and Albania where they hoped to reach the Adriatic coast and be rescued by Allied ships. The retreat took the remnants of the army together with the King, hundreds of thousands of civilian refugees as well as war prisoners, across some of the roughest terrains in Europe in the middle of winter, enduring harsh weather, treacherous roads, and enemy raids. Between November 1915 and January 1916, during the journey across the mountains, 77,455 soldiers and 160,000 civilians froze, starved to death, died of disease or were killed by enemies. Austrian pilots used the new technology of the time dropping bombs on the retreating columns in what has been called 'the first aerial bombardment of civilians'.

Out of the 400,000 people who set out on the journey, only 120,000 soldiers and 60,000 civilians reached the Adriatic coast to be evacuated by Allied ships to the island of Corfu where a Serbian government-in-exile headed by Prince-Regent Alexander and Nikola Pašić was established.  11,000 more Serbs would die later of disease, malnutrition, or exposure sustained on the retreat. In some sources published following the conflict, the event was described as the greatest and most tragic episode of the Great War.

Background

Serbian campaign

On July 28, 1914, a month after the assassination of Austrian archduke Franz Ferdinand, Austria-Hungary, the second-largest country in Europe, declared war on Serbia. Five months later after suffering a third major defeat on the battlefield, the Habsburg monarchy was left humiliated by "the peasant regiments of a small Balkan kingdom". Franz Ferdinand had not been avenged, with the Dual Monarchy losing twice as many men as the Serbs had. The blow to Habsburg prestige was incalculable and Serbia marked the first Allied victory of World War One.

In early 1915, the German chief of the general staff von Falkenhayn convinced the Austro-Hungarian chief of staff von Hoetzendorf to launch a new invasion of Serbia. In September Bulgaria signed a treaty of alliance with Germany and quickly mobilized its army. On 6 October 1915, combined German and Austro-Hungarian forces under the command of Field Marshall August von Mackensen attacked Serbia from the north and west with the intention of drawing the bulk of the Serbian forces along the Sava and Danube.

On 11 October, without a previous declaration of war, the Bulgarians started making attacks on Serbian border positions. On 14 October Bulgaria finally declared war on Serbia and the First and Second Armies, under the command of General Boyadzhiev, advanced into the Timok region of northeastern Serbia with the mission of cutting the vital rail line that ran from Salonika up the Vardar and Morava River valleys, and depriving Serbia of reinforcements and artillery ammunition. Numbering nearly 300,000 men, the forces of Bulgaria quickly overwhelmed the weak Serbian units along the frontier. The Serbian Army had 250,000 men of which a large number were already battling 300,000 Germans and Austrians in the north. In addition, Austrian troops soon started marching from Dalmatia.

Facing a front of  against three armies and as promises of aid and reinforcements from the Allies fell through, the Supreme Command of the Serbian Army started an organised retreat towards Kragujevac and Niš. For two days, the greatly outnumbered Serbian army held Prokuplje but eventually had to retreat. The pressure of the Austro-Hungarians, the Germans, and the Bulgarian First Army in the north and the Bulgarian Second Army advancing from the east forced the Serbs to retreat in a southwesterly direction into Kosovo.

Prelude

Kosovo Polje

In mid-November, the Serbian armies reached Pristina ahead of their pursuers, but were unable to break south through the blockade of the Bulgarian Second Army at Kačanik Pass near Skopje, in order to reach Salonika and establish the liaison with the French troops of General Sarrail. The goal of Mackensen was to corner the Serbs in the Kosovo area and force them to fight a decisive final battle.

The rupture of communications between Niš-Skopje-Salonika and the rupture of the liaison with the Allies brought the army into a most critical situation. Field Marshal Putnik began concentrating his troops for the purpose of securing access to the plateau of Gnjilane known as the "Field of Blackbirds".

The Austrian Luftfahrtruppen, that until then provided air support to the Austro-Hungarian army and communications between the German Eleventh and Bulgarian First Armies, started using reconnaissance aircraft to carry out bombing missions across the plain of Kosovo, striking the columns of refugees and blurring the lines between combatants and noncombatants in what has been called "the first-ever aerial bombardment of civilians". Albanians hostile to Serbs mounted guerrilla actions picking off weak detachments, acting in revenge for the repression they endured following the transfer of the province from Ottoman to Serbian and Montenegrin territory two years earlier.

The entire Bulgarian army, supported from the north by parts of the Eleventh German Army, now advanced against the Serbs. Following intense fighting on 23 November, Pristina and Mitrovica fell to the Central Powers and the Serbian government abandoned Prizren, its last temporary capital in Serbia.

Only three possibilities were considered: capitulation and separate peace, a final honourable-but-desperate battle of annihilation, or further retreat. Nevertheless, only retreating and counterattacking were seriously considered, while capitulation was not an option on the table; the Serbian government led by Prime Minister Nikola Pašić, Prince Regent Alexander and the Supreme Command under Field Marshall Radomir Putnik made the decision to order a general withdrawal and fight on from exile. The Serbian Government planned to reorganise and reform the army with the help and support from the Allies.

On 23 November, Vojvoda Putnik ordered all Serbian forces to use the last of the artillery ammunition and then bury the cannons, taking the breechblocks and sights with them; if burying the guns was impossible, they were to be rendered useless. Putnik also ordered that, to save them from being captured by the enemy, every boy near military age, from twelve to eighteen years old, 36 000 in total, was to follow the army and join the retreat with the goal of saving the country's manhood and raising soldiers for the future front. On 25 November 1915, an official order of retreat addressed to the commanders of all armies, was published by the Serbian High Command:

Retreat 

The Serbian Army split into three columns heading towards the mountains of Albania and Montenegro, pursued by the Austro-Hungarian Tenth Mountain Brigade and by the German Alpine Corps. The army's rock-bottom morale was boosted by the presence of the ailing, 71-year-old King Peter I, who had stepped aside  on June 14 to let his son Prince Alexander rule as Regent but now resumed his throne to face the crisis with his people. The elderly monarch, who was almost blind, traveled through the mountains riding in an ox cart.
In order to evade General Mackensen's final encirclement effort, the Serbian army, and a mass of civilians fleeing the massacres perpetrated by Austro-Hungarian troops, retreated along three routes, all converged on Lake Scutari, on the border of Albania and Montenegro, and from there headed towards the Adriatic.

Upon reaching Albania Essad Pasha Toptani, an Albanian leader and former Ottoman General, who was a Serb ally and the one central authority left in Albania, provided protection where this was possible. Where he was in control, his gendarmes gave support to retreating Serbian troops, but as the columns moved to territories in the north, attacks by Albanian tribesmen and irregulars became commonplace. The Serb-Montenegrin troops' brutal actions in the First Balkan War, made many of the locals ready to take their revenge on the soldiers retreating through the mountain passes, continuing the cycle of revenge with killing and looting.

Northern column
The Northern column took the route across southern Montenegro, from Peć to Scutari, via Rožaje, Andrijevica and Podgorica.

The group was composed of the First, Second and Third Army and the troops of the defense of Belgrade. It contained the largest contingent of Serbian troops and it also included a mobile medical unit named "The first Serbian-English Field Hospital", with two doctors, six nurses and six ambulance drivers. The unit was headed by British nurse and commissioned major, Mabel Stobart. The retreat of this force to Andrijevica was to take place under the direction of the First Army, which, with this object, was to occupy positions at Rožaje. Members of the Scottish Women's Hospitals for Foreign Service in Serbia also evacuated in this route, at times alongside the army.

The mission of the troops of the defense of Belgrade was to cover the retreat of the Army of the Timok as long as that army had not begun its movement of retreat, and then to retire in its turn. Because of this, the northern column delayed its departure from Peć until 7 December. It also had the responsibility to act as a rearguard against an attack by the Austro-Hungarians, Bulgarians, and Germans. 

Tracing an arc from northwest to southwest through Montenegrin territory and skirting the northern border of Albania through the snow-covered mountains, hunger, exposure, and disease killed soldiers and civilians, as well as prisoners of war traveling with them, by the thousands.

Serbian officers and artillery crews in Montenegro handed over 30 cannons to the Montenegrin Army, Montenegrin forces played a key role in covering up the withdrawal, most notably against Austro-Hungarian forces in the Battle of Mojkovac. The northern column began to reach Scutari on 15 December.

Central column

The central column took the route through central Kosovo across northern Albania, from Prizren to Scutari via Lum and Pukë.
The central column consisted of the King, the Crown Prince, the administration and the Supreme Command of the Army. Once across the Vizier's Bridge, the troops, who had retreated from Macedonia, would continue west through Albania, ultimately to Alessio. The Timok Division would also continue to move south and then west through Albania to Durrës. It had the shortest route to the sea but encountered some resistance from hostile Albanians.

Regent Alexander crossed it in just two and a half days and the Serbian government set off on 24 November and reached Scutari four days later. The officers of the Supreme Command who accompanied the Chief of the General Staff Radomir Putnik took longer, leaving on 26 November and arriving in Scutari on 6 December.

Southern column
The southern column followed the third route of withdrawal, from Prizren to Lum and further through the Albanian mountains to Debar and Struga.

The southern column was the first to depart and the last to arrive at the coast. The southern route presented the most direct way to make contact with Sarrail's Army of the Orient. The General Headquarters had asked the commanders of these groups to keep in constant telegraphic communication, but from the first day of the operations this was found to be impossible. The geography of the country did not allow of any other means of communication, so that the commanders of these groups were left to their own devices during the whole movement.

All the troops part of this group were placed under the orders of the commander of the Army of the Timok. The column left on 25 November and moved south all the way to Elbasan. Along the way it had to contend with Albanian resistance and Bulgarian attacks; on 10 December, the Bulgarians attacked Serbian positions along the crest of the Jablanica mountain range. As the Bulgarians again reached Struga before them, Serbian soldiers and civilians turned southwesterly, marching down the Albanian coast to Valona and across via Tirana reaching Durrës on 21 December.

Evacuation 

As early as 20 November, Pašić had sent an urgent message to Serbia's allies, asking for supplies, particularly food, to be sent to the Adriatic ports, but when the Northern and Central columns arrived in Scutari, they found the harbour empty of the foreign ships they had expected and hoped for. Food was dispatched from France and Britain but it was still in Brindisi in Italy. Fearing the presence of submarines, the Italians had only sent a few vessels, a convoy sent to Skadar earlier was destroyed by the Austro-Hungarian navy.

Eventually, a decision was made to evacuate the Serbian Army, and its accompanying civilians, to the French-occupied Greek island of Corfu and as far as Bizerta in French Tunisia. This decision, made primarily by the French and British, did not involve any discussions with the Greek authorities. 
The Allies sent their navies and the evacuation started on 15 January; the embarkation was made from three ports, San Giovanni di Medua, Durrës and Valona. Altogether, 45 Italian, 25 French and eleven British transport ships were employed in the evacuation; they carried out 202, 101 and nineteen voyages, respectively. The Duke of Abruzzi and Vice Admiral Emanuele Cutinelli Rendina, commander of Italian naval forces in the southern Adriatic (with headquarters in Brindisi), were tasked with planning the evacuation by sea; it was established that larger ships would load the troops in Durres and Vlore, whereas smaller vessels would be employed in San Giovanni di Medua. Rear Admiral Guglielmo Capomazza supervised the evacuation in Vlore.

On 14 January the Serbian government, ministers, and the members of the diplomatic corps boarded an Italian ship, the Citta di Bari, for Brindisi. On 6 February the Serbian supreme command and Regent Alexander were evacuated to Corfu, where around 120,000 evacuees had arrived by 15 February, and around 135,000 ten days later. Up to 10,000 evacuees were taken to Bizerta around the same time. The Italians took over the majority of Habsburg prisoners, and transferred them to the uninhabited island of Asinara (off the coast of Sardinia). Nearly 5,000 refugees, mostly women, children, and elderly people were taken to Corsica accompanied by the Serbian Relief Fund and the Scottish Women's military hospital.

Most of the Serb troops had been evacuated by 19 February. The cavalry division was last to embark on 5 April 1916, which marked the end of the operation.

Aftermath

According to the official statistics from 1919, 77,455 Serbian soldiers died, while 77,278 went missing. The worst fate befell the Southern Column, where approximately 36,000 young boys, some who would have become conscripts in 1916, but some as young as twelve, had been ordered by the Army to join the retreat; within a month about 23,000 of them died.

Of the estimated 220,000 civilian refugees who had set off for the Adriatic coast from Kosovo, only about 60,000 survived. Those who survived were so weak that thousands of them died from sheer exhaustion in the weeks after their rescue. Because the rock composition of the island made it hard to dig graves, those who died on the journey were buried at sea. Bodies were lowered from French ships into the depths of the Ionian Sea, near the Greek island of Vido; more than 5,000 Serbs are believed to have been buried this way. The sea around Vido is known as "The Blue Graveyard" (Plava grobnica)" Field Marshal Putnik traveled to France for medical treatment, where he died the following year. Nearly 5,000 Serbian refugees, mostly women and children were sent to Corsica, evacuated from Albania, they were attended by the staff of the Scottish Women's military hospital who had travelled with them, an operation financed by the Serbian Relief Fund based in London. Many of the young boys who had survived the retreat were sent to France and Britain for schooling.

Serbia was divided into separate Austro-Hungarian and Bulgarian military occupation zones. In the Austro-Hungarian zone of occupation (northern and central Serbia), the Military General Governorate of Serbia was established with its center in Belgrade. In the territory occupied by the Bulgarians, a military government was set up with its center in Niš, the area was divided into two administrative zones. Both the Austrian and the Bulgarian occupation regimes were very harsh, the population was exposed to various measures of repression, including mass internment, forced labor, concentration camps for political opponents, starvation, Denationalization and Bulgarisation policy. Kosovo was divided into two Austro-Hungarian occupational zones: Metohija entered the Austro-Hungarian Military Government of Montenegro, while a smaller part of Kosovo with Mitrovica and Vucitrn became part of the Austro-Hungarian Military Government of Serbia. The greater part of Kosovo – Pristina, Prizren, Gnjilane, Urosevac, Orahovac was included in the Bulgarian Military Region of Macedonia.

During 1916, more than 110,000 Serbian troops were transferred to Salonika, where they joined the Allied army after Greece entered the war; some six Serbian infantry divisions and one cavalry division, named after regions and rivers in their homeland would eventually return to serve, playing a key role in the breakthrough of the Macedonian Front in September 1917, and the liberation of their homeland a year later.

The great retreat is considered by Serbs to be one of the greatest tragedies in their nation's history. it would be remembered, using biblical symbolism, as the Albanian Golgotha, a sacred sacrifice followed by the national 'resurrection' of Serbia's victory at the end of the war.

Images

See also 
 Commemorative Medal of the Great Serbian Retreat
 Gde Cveta Limun Žut, (2006). A documentary film about the Serbian army's retreat.
 King Peter of Serbia, (2018). A feature film starring Lazar Ristovski.
 Kreće se lađa francuska, A World War I song composed by Branislav Milosavljević in Corfu.
 Serbian Museum of Corfu
 Tamo Daleko, A World War I song composed in Corfu.

References

Citations

Bibliography 

 
 
 
 
 
 
 
 
 
 </ref>
 
 
 
 
 
 
 
 
 
 
 
 
 
 
 
 
 
 </ref>

Further reading

External links 
 
 Life in occupied Serbia 1915 – 1918, Magazine ″Defense″, special edition No 135, Miljan Milkich, December 15, 2015. (Serbian)
 Golgotha of Serbian Army, Magazine ″Defense″, special edition No 136, Snezana Nikolich, January 1, 2016. (Serbian)
 In the bosom of Bizerte, Magazine ″Defense″, special edition No 138, Snezana Nikolich, February 15, 2016. (Serbian)
 Corfu – Island of Salvation, Magazine ″Defense″, special edition No 148, Milan Milkic, July 15, 2016. (Serbian)

Serbia in World War I
Conflicts in 1915
Conflicts in 1916
1915 in Serbia
1915 in Albania
1915 in Montenegro
1916 in Serbia
1916 in Albania
1916 in Montenegro
Albania in World War I
Battles of World War I involving Serbia
Battles of World War I involving Montenegro
Battles of World War I involving Austria-Hungary
Battles of World War I involving Germany
Battles of World War I involving Bulgaria
Battles of the Balkans Theatre (World War I)
Battles involving Serbia
Battles involving Austria
Battles involving Montenegro